John Luttrell may refer to:

 Sir John Luttrell (soldier) (c. 1518–1551), English soldier and courtier
 John Luttrell (picture)
 John Luttrell (1566–1620), English lawyer and politician, MP for Minehead 1586 and 1589
 John K. Luttrell (1831–1893), U.S. Representative from California
 John Fownes Luttrell (1752–1816) of Dunster Castle, MP for Minehead 1774–1806 and 1807–16
 John Fownes Luttrell (1787–1857) of Dunster Castle, MP for Minehead 1812–32

See also 
 John Lutterell (died 1335), English medieval philosopher, theologian, and university chancellor
 Feudal barony of Dunster